Thomas Keenan may refer to:

 Tommy Keenan, Irish basketball player
 Thomas P. Keenan (1866–1927), Irish songwriter